Events in the year 1795 in Norway.

Incumbents
Monarch: Christian VII

Events
28 January - The town of Farsund was founded.

Arts and literature

 Old Åsane Church was built.

Births
23 March - Bernt Michael Holmboe, mathematician (d.1850)
7 November - Hans Riddervold, bishop and politician (d.1876)
2 December - Hans Nicolai Lange, priest and politician (d.1848)

Full date unknown
Nicolai Benjamin Cappelen, jurist and politician (d.1866)
Mensen Ernst, road runner and ultramarathoner (d.1843)
Christopher Simonsen Fougner, politician (d.1869)
Hans Andersen Kiær, businessperson and politician (d.1867)

Deaths

See also

References